The FCW Divas Championship was a women's professional wrestling championship owned and promoted by Florida Championship Wrestling (FCW), a former developmental territory of WWE. It was contested for in their women's division. A tournament was held to determine the inaugural champion.

The first champion was Naomi Knight who won an eight-woman tournament on June 10, 2010, by defeating Serena in the tournament finals. There were six reigns shared between six wrestlers, and one vacancy. In August 2012, the championship was retired when FCW closed down in favor of NXT, WWE's new development system. The final champion was Caylee Turner, however due to her August 2012 release, the championship was already vacated when it was deactivated as a result of the re-branding. The title was replaced the following year with the NXT Women's Championship.

Inaugural championship tournament (2010)

A tournament was held at the FCW television tapings from April to June 2010 to determine the inaugural champion.

Reigns

See also
Queen of FCW

References

State professional wrestling championships
WWE women's championships
Divas Championship
Women's sports in Florida